The enzyme dimethylaniline-N-oxide aldolase catalyzes the chemical reaction

N,N-dimethylaniline N-oxide  N-methylaniline + formaldehyde

This enzyme belongs to the family of lyases, specifically the aldehyde-lyases, which cleave carbon-carbon bonds.  The systematic name of this enzyme class is N,N-dimethylaniline-N-oxide formaldehyde-lyase (N-methylaniline-forming). Other names in common use include microsomal oxidase II, microsomal N-oxide dealkylase, and N,N-dimethylaniline-N-oxide formaldehyde-lyase.

References

 

EC 4.1.2
Enzymes of unknown structure